Chalcosyrphus (Xylotomima) plesia (Curran 1925), the Black-hipped Leafwalker, is an uncommon species of syrphid fly and a mimic of Sphex nudus. This fly is found in the northeastern United States and southeastern Canada. Hoverflies can remain nearly motionless while in flight. The adults are also known as flower flies for they are commonly found around and on flowers, from which they get both energy-giving nectar and protein-rich pollen.

Distribution
Canada, United States.

References

Eristalinae
Diptera of North America
Hoverflies of North America
Taxa named by Charles Howard Curran
Insects described in 1925